John William Sutcliffe (14 April 1868 – 7 July 1947), commonly known as John Willie Sutcliffe and J.W. Sutcliffe, was an English football and rugby union player. He was the last person to represent England at full international level in both sports.

Life and career
Born in Shibden, he started his career in 1886 at Bradford Rugby Club playing at either full back or centre three quarter before moving to the club from Heckmondwike where he gained his only cap for England against the New Zealand Natives in 1889, scoring one try, and one conversion for five points.

Heckmondwike was suspended by the Rugby Football Union over allegations of professionalism and he switched codes to play football for Bolton Wanderers, finally playing in the first team as a goalkeeper. Here he gained his first of five England caps against Wales in a 6–0 win in 1893. 1894 saw him on the losing side in the FA Cup final.

1902 saw Sutcliffe at Southern League Millwall Athletic before moving on in 1903 to Manchester United where he played 28 games. He joined Plymouth Argyle in January 1905 and by the end of the season had become the club's first choice goalkeeper. The Argyle handbook for the 1905–06 season describes Sutcliffe as "a marvel for his years." In more than seven years with the club, he made 214 appearances in league competition and four in the FA Cup. He left the club at the end of the 1911–12 campaign and became a player-coach at Southend United. His last known club was South Kirkby Colliery, who he joined in 1913.

Sutcliffe was appointed manager of Dutch club Vitesse Arnhem in 1914. He returned to England after the First World War to work for Bradford City as a coach. Sutcliffe died on 7 July 1947 at the age of 79 in Bradford.

References

External links

Plymouth Argyle A Complete Record 1903–1989, Brian Knight 
Plymouth Argyle 101 Golden Greats, Andy Richie 
Statistics at scrum.com
Biography of Arthur Budd with an England team photograph including John Willie Sutcliffe

1868 births
1947 deaths
Association football goalkeepers
Bolton Wanderers F.C. players
Bradford F.C. players
England international footballers
England international rugby union players
English expatriate football managers
English Football League players
English Football League representative players
English football managers
English footballers
English rugby union players
FA Cup Final players
Footballers from Halifax, West Yorkshire
Footballers who switched code
Heckmondwike RFC players
Manchester United F.C. players
Millwall F.C. players
Plymouth Argyle F.C. players
Rugby league players from Halifax, West Yorkshire
Rugby union players from Halifax, West Yorkshire
SBV Vitesse managers
South Kirkby Colliery F.C. players
Southend United F.C. players
Southern Football League players
Western Football League players